Bob James (October 20, 1933 – December 13, 2016) was an American sailor. He competed in the Flying Dutchman event at the 1968 Summer Olympics.

References

External links
 

1933 births
2016 deaths
American male sailors (sport)
Olympic sailors of the United States
Sailors at the 1968 Summer Olympics – Flying Dutchman
People from Mathews County, Virginia